Maria Santos may refer to:

María Santos, Argentine actress of the 1940s
Maria Santos (swimmer) (born 1978), Portuguese swimmer
Maria Amélia Santos (born 1952), Portuguese politician
María Santos Corrales (1797–1881), Peruvian woman
María Santos Gorrostieta Salazar (1976–2012), Mexican physician and politician
Maria Antónia Almeida Santos, Portuguese politician
María Isabel Pérez Santos, Mexican politician
Maria Santos (All My Children), a fictional character from the ABC soap opera All My Children